An-Nawier Mosque is one of the oldest mosques in Jakarta, Indonesia. It is located at Pekojan, Tambora, a district of Jakarta. The mosque is a symbol of Arab civilization in Jakarta. The mosque is large and ancient architecture stands majestically in one densely populated settlement of West Jakarta. The settlement was once a region whose majority population is descended from Arabs, Yemen and India. Although the number of Arabs is now no longer prominent, but traces can still be found until now in Pekojan.

History
This mosque was formerly built by Sayid Abdullah bin Huseim Alaydrius who also came from Hadramaut (Yemen) in 1760. It is alleged that the builder of the mosque was the descendant of the prophet Muhammad. mosque has undergone several renovations and maintenance. Of the several times, the renovation in 1800s was the most physically changing mosque. Repairs that have lasted more than two centuries ago made An Nawier Mosque, which was previously walled wood into a brick wall. Expansion of the mosque in 1850 conducted by Commander Dahlan from Banten. Syarifah Kecil or Syarifah Fatimah bint Husein Al Idrus then donated a plot of his property for the expansion of the mosque in 1897. Prayer building of the mosque resembles pattern of the letter L.The mosque has a land area of about 2,000 square meters and a building area of 1,500 square meters. The mosque is able to accommodate up to 1,000 pilgrims. The mosque has three entrances in north, south and eastern side. There are 33 poles in the mosque. The mosque has a pulpit, which was gifted in 1871 by the Sultan of Pontianak. The tower of the mosque resembles a lighthouse.

See also 
 Islam in Indonesia
 List of mosques in Indonesia

References

Mosques completed in the 1760s
Mosques in Jakarta
Religious buildings and structures completed in 1760